Phyllis Barnhart (December 16, 1922 – February 6, 2008) was an American animator and cel painter. She was best known for her work on the 1982 animated film, The Secret of NIMH (which was her only credit in an animated film, coincidentally enough).

Naomi Phyllis Fowler was born on December 16, 1922, in Levan, Utah. She began her career in animation at the Disney studio during the 1940s, starting on the films Fun & Fancy Free and Melody Time, at the inking and painting department. She later worked as a freelance assistant animator and cel painter for such classic animation studios as Filmation, Hanna-Barbera, Bandolier Films, Chuck Jones Productions, Murakami-Wolf-Swenson, DePatie-Freleng and of course, Disney. She worked as one of the lead cel painters for The Secret of NIMH (1982), which was created at Don Bluth Productions.

Barnhart's husband Dale Barnhart, died in 1996. He worked as a Disney layout and background artist on films such as The Jungle Book and The Sword in the Stone.

Phyllis Barnhart died at the age of 85 on February 6, 2008, in Salt Lake City, Utah. She was survived by her daughter, Fotini, and three sons, Rhio, Roberleigh and Philo Barnhart (who worked as an assistant animator on films such as The Secret of NIMH and Beauty and the Beast).

References

External links

Cinematical: RIP Reel Important People, Phyllis Barnhart

1922 births
2008 deaths
People from Juab County, Utah
Animators from Utah
American women animators
Walt Disney Animation Studios people
Filmation people
Hanna-Barbera people
Sullivan Bluth Studios people